Birds described in 1871 include Asian ostrich, Père David's snowfinch, Biak lorikeet, Mongolian ground jay, Forest wood hoopoe, Numfor paradise kingfisher, Spot-breasted parrotbill

Events
Death of  Paolo Savi and Niels Kjærbølling 
Théophile Rudolphe Studer becomes  curator of zoological collections at the Natural History Museum of Bern

Publications
Richard Bowdler Sharpe Catalogue of African Birds in the Collection of R.B. Sharpe. London: Self published. 1871.
Henry Eeles Dresser and Richard Bowdler Sharpe A History of the Birds of Europe, Including all the Species Inhabiting the Western Palearctic Region.Taylor & Francis of Fleet Street, London
Frederick Hutton, 1871 Catalogue of the Birds of New Zealand, with Diagnoses of the Species
Ongoing events

Theodor von Heuglin Ornithologie von Nordost-Afrika (Ornithology of Northeast Africa) (Cassel, 1869–1875)
John Gould The birds of Asia 1850-83 7 vols. 530 plates, Artists: J. Gould, H. C. Richter, W. Hart and J. Wolf; Lithographers:H. C. Richter and W. Hart
The Ibis

References

Bird
Birding and ornithology by year